VSV can refer to:

Vesicular stomatitis virus, a virus in the family Rhabdoviridae
Vishista Seva Vibhushanaya, a military decoration of Sri Lanka
VSV EC, an Austrian ice hockey team
Very Slender Vessel, a type of high speed boat